Vincent Gibson (14 May 1916 – 28 November 1983) was an Australian cricketer. He played in eight first-class matches for South Australia between 1939 and 1947.

See also
 List of South Australian representative cricketers

References

External links
 

1916 births
1983 deaths
Australian cricketers
South Australia cricketers
Cricketers from Adelaide